Romain Beynié (born 6 May 1987, in Lyon) is a French midfielder currently playing for FC Gueugnon.

Career
 1993–2001: Football Club de L'Arbresle
 2001 – January 2010: Olympique lyonnais
 2008–2009: AFC Tubize (on loan)
 Since January 2010: FC Gueugnon

Beynié began his football career with FC L'Arbresle, before moving to his hometown club Olympique Lyonnais in 2002 to begin his professional career. Despite being so young, he made his professional debut in a Champions League match against Norwegian side Rosenborg BK in 2005. His appearance would be brief though, appearing as a 90th-minute substitute.

Beynié was promoted to the senior squad for the 2007–08 season. He was given the squad number 24. He did not make an appearance in Ligue 1 competition that season. The following season, with Lyon promoted several other promising youth players to the senior squad, Beynié was loaned out to Belgian club and recently promoted A.F.C. Tubize in order to gain some much needed playing time. Though Tubize suffered relegation for the 2008–09 Jupiler League season, Beynié performed well, appearing in 23 of the 34 league matches, starting them all.

Honours
 Trophée des Champions: 2006

References

External links
 Official website of Romain Beynié
 Olympique Lyonnais Official Website Profile
 Romain Beynie league stats

1987 births
Living people
French footballers
French expatriate footballers
Belgian Pro League players
Championnat National players
Olympique Lyonnais players
A.F.C. Tubize players
Expatriate footballers in Belgium
French sportspeople of Central African Republic descent
Association football midfielders